The 6th Annual Grammy Awards were held on May 12, 1964, at Chicago, Los Angeles and New York. They recognized accomplishments by musicians for the year 1963. Henry Mancini won 4 awards.

Award winners
Record of the Year
Henry Mancini for "Days of Wine and Roses"
Album of the Year (other than classical)
Barbra Streisand for The Barbra Streisand Album
Song of the Year
Henry Mancini & Johnny Mercer (songwriters) for "Days of Wine and Roses" performed by Henry Mancini
Best New Artist
Ward Swingle (The Swingle Singers)

Children's
Best Recording for Children
Leonard Bernstein (conductor) for Bernstein Conducts for Young People performed by the New York Philharmonic

Classical
Best Classical Performance - Orchestra
Erich Leinsdorf (conductor) & the Boston Symphony Orchestra for Bartók: Concerto for Orchestra
Best Classical Performance - Vocal Soloist (with or without orchestra)
Skitch Henderson (conductor), Leontyne Price & the RCA Orchestra for Great Scenes From Gershwin's Porgy and Bess
Best Opera Recording
Erich Leinsdorf (conductor), Rosalind Elias, Leontyne Price, Richard Tucker & the RCA Italiana Opera Orchestra for Puccini: Madama Butterfly
Best Classical Performance - Choral (other than opera)
Benjamin Britten (conductor), Edward Chapman, David Willcocks (choir directors), the Bach Choir, Highgate School Choir & the London Symphony Orchestra & Choir for Britten: War Requiem
Best Classical Performance - Instrumental Soloist or Soloists (with orchestra)
Erich Leinsdorf (conductor), Arthur Rubinstein & the Boston Symphony Orchestra for Tchaikovsky: Piano Concerto No. 1 in B Flat Minor
Best Classical Performance - Instrumental Soloist or Duo (without orchestra)
Vladimir Horowitz for The Sound of Horowitz
Best Classical Music Performance - Chamber Music
Julian Bream for Evening of Elizabethan Music performed by the Julian Bream Consort
Best Classical Composition by a Contemporary Composer
Benjamin Britten (composer & conductor) & the London Symphony Orchestra for Britten: War Requiem
Best Classical Album
Benjamin Britten (conductor) & the London Symphony Orchestra for Britten: War Requiem
Most Promising New Classical Recording Artist
André Watts

Comedy
Best Comedy Performance
Allan Sherman for "Hello Mudduh, Hello Faddah"

Composing and arranging
Best Instrumental Theme
Riz Ortolani (composer) for "More - Theme From Mondo Cane"
Best Original Score from a Motion Picture or Television Show
John Addison (composer) for Tom Jones
Best Instrumental Arrangement
Quincy Jones (arranger) for "I Can't Stop Loving You" performed by Count Basie
Best Background Arrangement
Henry Mancini (arranger) for "Days of Wine and Roses"

Country
Best Country & Western Recording
Bobby Bare for "Detroit City"

Folk
Best Folk Recording
Peter, Paul and Mary for "Blowin' in the Wind"

Gospel
Best Gospel or Other Religious Recording (Musical)
Soeur Sourire for "Dominique"

Jazz
Best Instrumental Jazz Performance - Soloist or Small Group
Bill Evans for Conversations with Myself
Best Instrumental Jazz Performance - Large Group
Woody Herman for Encore: Woody Herman, 1963
Best Original Jazz Composition
Steve Allen & Ray Brown (composers) for "Gravy Waltz" performed by Steve Allen

Musical show
Best Score From an Original Cast Show Album
Jerry Bock, Sheldon Harnick (composers) & the original cast (Barbara Cook, Jack Cassidy, Barbara Baxley, Daniel Massey, Nathaniel Frey, Ralph Williams & Jo Wilder) for She Loves Me

Packaging and notes
Best Album Cover - Classical
Robert M. Jones (art director) for Puccini: Madama Butterfly conducted by Erich Leinsdorf
Best Album Cover - Other Than Classical
John Berg for The Barbra Streisand Album performed by Barbra Streisand
Best Album Notes
Stanley Dance & Leonard Feather (notes writers) for The Ellington Era performed by Duke Ellington

Pop
Best Vocal Performance, Female
Barbra Streisand for The Barbra Streisand Album
Best Vocal Performance, Male
Jack Jones for "Wives and Lovers"
Best Performance by a Vocal Group
Peter, Paul and Mary for "Blowin' in the Wind"
Best Performance by a Chorus
Ward Swingle for Bach's Greatest Hits performed by the Swingle Singers
Best Performance by an Orchestra - for Dancing
Count Basie for This Time by Basie! Hits of the 50s and 60s
Best Performance by an Orchestra or Instrumentalist with Orchestra, Not for Jazz or Dancing
Al Hirt for "Java"
Best Rock and Roll Recording
April Stevens & Nino Tempo for "Deep Purple"

Production and engineering
Best Engineered Recording - Other Than Classical
James Malloy (engineer) for  Charade performed by Henry Mancini
Best Engineered Recording - Classical
Lewis W. Layton (engineer), Erich Leinsdorf (conductor) & the RCA Italiana Opera Orchestra for Puccini: Madama Butterfly
Best Engineered Recording - Special or Novel Effects
Robert Fine (engineer) for Civil War Vol. II performed by Frederick Fennell

R&B
Best Rhythm & Blues Recording
Ray Charles for "Busted"

Spoken
Best Documentary, Spoken Word or Drama Recording (other than comedy)
Edward Albee (playwright) for Who's Afraid of Virginia Woolf? performed by Melinda Dillon, George Grizzard, Uta Hagen & Arthur Hill

References

 006
1964 in Los Angeles
1964 in Illinois
1964 in New York City
1964 music awards
1960s in Chicago
Events in Los Angeles
Events in New York City
1964 in American music
May 1964 events in the United States
Events in Chicago